Kuku, Kuko or Koukou is a village in the Aït Yahia commune of Tizi Ouzou Province in northern Algeria.

References

Populated places in Tizi Ouzou Province
Algeria geography articles needing translation from French Wikipedia